The Khökh-Adar mine (blue ceiling) is an exploration field and mine in development for copper extraction located in the Tolbo sum of Bayan-Ölgii aimag in western Mongolia.

The reserves holds approximately 96,700 tons of copper, 43,200 tons of lead, and 18,200 tons of zinc.

References 

Copper mines in Mongolia